Bar Aftab (also Romanized as Bar Āftāb; also known as Bar Āftāb-e Manganān, Bar Āftāb-e Monganān, Bar Aftau, and Bat Aftau) is a village in Haparu Rural District, in the Central District of Bagh-e Malek County, Khuzestan Province, Iran. At the 2006 census, its population was 562, in 104 families.

References 

Populated places in Bagh-e Malek County